The Screen Actors Guild Award for Outstanding Performance by a Stunt Ensemble in a Television Series is one of the awards given by the Screen Actors Guild. The award was awarded for the first time in 2007.

There is a corresponding SAG Award for work in film.

Winners and nominees

2000s

2010s

2020s

Multiple awards
8 awards
Game of Thrones (7 consecutive)

2 awards
24

References

External links
 SAG Awards official site

Stunt Ensemble Television Series
Stunt awards